Alexandru Radu may refer to:

 Alexandru Radu (footballer, born 1997), Romanian footballer for Petrolul Ploiești
 Alexandru Radu (footballer, born 1982), Romanian former footballer.